Wheelock Pond may refer to:

 Wheelock Pond (Millers Mills, New York), Millers Mills, New York
 Wheelock Pond (West Winfield, New York), West Winfield, New York